The Parliament House of Thailand was a building which housed the National Assembly, the legislative branch of the Government of Thailand from 1974 to 2018. The legislature is a bicameral body, consisting of two chambers: the upper house (the Senate of Thailand), and the lower house (the House of Representatives of Thailand). The Parliament House of Thailand is in the Dusit District of the capital, Bangkok. In 2019 the legislature moved into a new building named the Sappaya-Sapasathan, which became the new parliament house.

History

After the first general election to the National Assembly in 1933, King Prajadhipok gave the Ananta Samakhom Throne Hall to the new legislature. The Throne Hall was previously part of Dusit Palace. Throughout the years the composition of the National Assembly increased and the Throne Hall became too small to accommodate all the members and the parliament's support offices. Three attempts were made to build a new building, however, each failed because the government in power was unseated before a budget could be appropriated. King Bhumibol Adulyadej appropriated to the National Assembly royal land immediately north of the Throne Hall for the site of the new Parliament House. Construction began on 5 November 1970, with a budget of 51,027,360 baht.

Structure
The new Parliament House complex is composed of three buildings:

 The First Building: the Parliament House, has three stories and contains meeting chambers for the National Assembly, shared by both the Senate and the House. It also contains the offices of the President and Vice President of the National Assembly and the deputy presiding officers.
 The Second Building: a seven-story building contains the Secretariat and offices of the National Assembly as well as its printing press.
 The Third Building: a two-story building used as the parliament club with facilities for assembly members.

Parliament House was first used on 19 September 1974, as the Ananta Samakhom Throne Hall became once more a part of the Dusit Palace and returned permanently to the Thai monarchy. From then on Parliament House became the primary building used for the National Assembly, only the State Opening is held in the Throne Hall.

Statue of King Prajadhipok
At the front of the legislative building is a statue of a seated King Prajadhipok The statue is half life-size. It depicts the king in royal regalia, sitting on the Phuttan Kanchanasinghat Throne. The Thai Parliament Museum is underneath the statue.

New parliament building

A new 424,000 square metre parliament building, named Sappaya-Sapasathan, is due to be inaugurated by the end of 2020. It was contracted for in 2013 and was scheduled to be opened in 2015. It sits on a bank of the Chao Phraya River in Kiakkai, occupying 300,000 m2 of land. The site of the current parliament building was returned to its previous owner, the Bureau of the Royal Household, at the end of 2018. Construction of the new building, however, has been delayed for four years. Concurrently, the project budget has ballooned from 14 billion baht to 23 billion baht. Parliament has levied no penalties on the developer for missing the deadline. As the land where the old parliament building sits has been returned to the Crown Property Bureau, Parliament, starting in May, has been meeting in an auditorium rented from telecom firm TOT at a cost of 11 million baht per month.

Around February of 2019, the Bureau of the Royal Household began demolishing the remaining buildings and was merged into the area of Dusit Palace.

Gallery

See also

 National Assembly of Thailand – Legislature of Thailand
 Senate of Thailand
 House of Representatives of Thailand
 Ananta Samakhom Throne Hall – Previous home of the National Assembly
 Government House of Thailand – Home of the executive branch of the Royal Thai Government
 Thai Parliament Museum

References

External links 
 Parliament of Thailand
 Senate of Thailand

Government buildings in Bangkok
Demolished buildings and structures in Bangkok
Dusit district
Thailand
Thailand
Parliament of Thailand